Leslie Jean Egnot  (born 28 February 1963 in Greenville, South Carolina) is an American-born yachtswoman who competed for New Zealand at two Olympic Games and won a silver medal, with Jan Shearer, at the 1992 Summer Olympics in Barcelona, Spain in the women's 470 class.

Egnot had previously been a reserve for Shearer and Fiona Galloway at the 1988 Summer Olympics in Seoul, and Egnot and Shearer competed again at 1996 Summer Olympics in Atlanta where they finished 16th, hampered by an injury Egnot was carrying at the time.

Egnot, who moved to New Zealand with her family when she was 10, reverted to her American passport in 1995 and became the first woman to helm an America's Cup yacht when she led the all-woman crew of Mighty Mary in the 1995 Citizen Cup, the defender selection series regatta for the 1995 America's Cup.

In the 1996 Queen's Birthday Honours, Egnot was appointed an Officer of the New Zealand Order of Merit, for services to yachting.

Egnot's younger sister Jenny Egnot has also represented New Zealand in yachting at the Olympics, competing in the 470 at the 2000 Summer Olympics in Sydney.

References

External links
 
 
 
 

1963 births
Living people
New Zealand female sailors (sport)
Sailors at the 1992 Summer Olympics – 470
Sailors at the 1996 Summer Olympics – 470
Olympic sailors of New Zealand
Olympic silver medalists for New Zealand
Sportspeople from Greenville, South Carolina
Olympic medalists in sailing
Officers of the New Zealand Order of Merit
Medalists at the 1992 Summer Olympics
2000 America's Cup sailors
1995 America's Cup sailors
American emigrants to New Zealand